deciBel Research, Inc. is a small high-technology business with emphasis on advancements in radar systems and sensor technologies, currently supporting U.S. Army and Missile Defense Agency customers. Headquartered in Huntsville, Alabama, the staff of deciBel Research, Inc. specializes in the design, development, testing, and applications of advanced radar systems.

References

 Huntsville Chamber of Commerce 2006 Small Business Awards Nominees (archived link, September 27, 2007)

External links
 

Companies based in Huntsville, Alabama
Defense companies of the United States